The American Museum of the Miniature Arts was a non-profit museum in Dallas, Texas (USA) that focused on miniature art.  Much of the museum's collection was previously on display in the Sharp Gallery at the Hall of State at Fair Park.

References

External links 
 The American Museum of the Miniature Arts

Art museums and galleries in Texas
Museums in Dallas
Miniature painting
Defunct museums in Texas
Arts in Dallas